Bejo Dohmen (born 1984 in Cologne, West Germany) is a German actor.

Filmography 
 2019 Tempo (Facebook Watch Series)
 2019 Unter Tannen (TV movie)
 2019 Villa Eva (TV movie)
 2018 Heldt (TV series)
 2018 Aisha
 2018 Darknet
 2018 Freundinnen – Jetzt erst recht (TV series)
 2018 Falk (TV series)
 2018 Unter Tannen (TV series)
 2018 Ready to Rumble (TV pilot)
 2018 Kommando 1944
 2017 True Crime
 2017 It's your turn honey
 2014 Pastewka (TV series)
 2014 Marie Brand und das Mädchen im Ring (TV movie)
 2014 Alles was zählt (TV series)
 2013 Cologne P.D. (TV series)
 2013 Tatort – Melinda (TV movie)
 2013 Break up man
 2012 Auslandseinsatz (TV movie)
 2011 Unter uns (TV series)
 2011 Quirk of Fate

Awards and nominations

References

External links 
 Dohmen on IMDb

Living people
21st-century German male actors
1984 births